The  (English: "Church of the Angel Raphael") is a church in Venice, northern Italy, located in the Dorsoduro sestiere. San Raffaele Arcangelo church is one of the only two churches in Venice that are possible to walk all around. It is located in Dorsoduro neighbourhood, close to San Basilio water bus stop.

History
According to tradition, this church was one of the eight churches founded in Venice by St Magnus of Oderzo. The church suffered fires in 889, 1106 and 1149, each time being rebuilt. At the beginning of the 17th century the edifice was in poor condition, and was therefore demolished and rebuilt. Works were finished in 1743–49.

The church plan is a Greek cross, with the façade facing a minor canal named after the church, rio dell'Angelo Raffaele. The interior houses sculptures by Sebastiano Mariani and Michelangelo Morlaiter. Among the statues is one of the Archangel Raphael leading a boy with a fish; the archangel was a patron saint of fishermen.

The center ceiling of the nave and the Baptistry has a decoration by Francesco Fontebasso. The present organ was built in 1821 by the brothers Antonio and Agostino Callido, son of the more famous organ maker, Gaetano Callido. It was restored by Giacomo Bazzani and his sons in 1848, and more recently by the Tamburini family.

This small church is in a distant corner of Venice; it is best known for the painted organ doors depicting the Story of Tobias, attributed to the late 18th century vedutista Gianantonio Guardi. While Guardi is also known for his misty lagoon vistas of Venice, in this religious painting the scene explodes with scintillating brushstrokes. It is a parting demonstration that the Venetian school still had a flash of originality. The  (touch painting) world of these paintings exists in a world where clouds and bodies are feathered with color. A last firework of paint dabbed just a few decades before the real blasts of Napoleonic grapeshot were heard by the last Doge.

Additional works in the church include:
Assumption of the Virgin by Andrea Vicentino (first altar on right)
St Francis receives the Stigmata by Palma il Giovane (second altar on right)
Last Supper by Andrea del Friso
Last Supper by Bonifacio Veronese
St Alvise Bishop with Saints Sebastian, Jerome, and John the Evangelist by Francesco Fontebasso
The Centurion before Christ by Andrea del Friso
St Helena finds the True Cross by Giovanni Battista Zelotti

Exterior

Interior

References

The Churches of Venice :  Dorsoduro : Angelo Raffaele

Roman Catholic churches completed in 1749
18th-century Roman Catholic church buildings in Italy
Raffaele